There are 2 school districts in the province of Prince Edward Island, Canada. Formerly 5, the number has decreased with merges in some areas of the province.

Current school districts

Former school districts

See also
List of schools in Prince Edward Island
Higher education in Prince Edward Island

School districts
Prince Edward Island
Education in Prince Edward Island
Former school districts in Prince Edward Island